Trijama (English: Three Facets) is a 1956 Indian Bengali-language romantic drama film directed by Agradoot, based on Subodh Ghosh's novel of the same name. This film was released under the banner of Sunrise Films. Music direction of the film was made by Nachiketa Ghosh. Film starring Uttam Kumar and Suchitra Sen in lead role.

Plot
This is a story of a girl, Swarupa (Suchitra), who's unable to get her love, Kushal (Uttam Kumar)’s attention, however much she tries. But she, a silent type, suffers quietly. Kushal loves another woman who's rich as well as beautiful, Abala ( Anubha Gupta). But when with a sudden turn of fate he loses everything, his ladylove Abala leaves him too, and settles for a conniving richer man. This acts as an eye-opener and soon Kushal is back to where he belongs, in the world of Swarupa.

Cast
 Uttam Kumar as Kushal
 Suchitra Sen as Swarupa
 Chhabi Biswas as Kushal's Father
 Anubha Gupta as Nabala
 Kamal Mitra as Nabala's Father
 Chandrabati Devi as Kushal's Mother
 Chhaya Devi as Abala's Mother
 Haridhan Mukhopadhyay
 Jiben Bose
 Sobha Sen
 Nitish Mukherjee as Ramji
 Jahar Ganguly
 Dhiresh Banerjee
 Mihir Bhattacharya
 Ketaki Dutta

Soundtrack

The song is become very popular and so famous even today.

Notes

References

External links
 

1956 films
1956 romantic drama films
Bengali-language Indian films
Indian romantic drama films
Indian black-and-white films
Films based on Indian novels
1950s Bengali-language films